Coumaroyl-coenzyme A  is the thioester of coenzyme-A and coumaric acid. Coumaroyl-coenzyme A is a central intermediate in  the biosynthesis of myriad natural products found in plants. These products include lignols (precursors to lignin and lignocellulose), flavonoids, isoflavonoids, coumarins, aurones, stilbenes, catechin, and other phenylpropanoids.

Biosynthesis and significance
It is generated in nature from phenylalanine, which is converted by PAL to trans-cinnamate.  Trans-cinnamate is hydroxylated by trans-cinnamate 4-monooxygenase to give 4-hydroxycinnamate (i.e, coumarate).  Coumarate is condensed with coenzyme-A in the presence of 4-coumarate-CoA ligase:
ATP + 4-coumarate + CoA  AMP + diphosphate + 4-coumaroyl-CoA.

Enzymes using Coumaroyl-Coenzyme A 
 Anthocyanin 3-O-glucoside 6''-O-hydroxycinnamoyltransferase
 Anthocyanin 5-aromatic acyltransferase
 Chalcone synthase
 4-Coumarate-CoA ligase
 6'-Deoxychalcone synthase
 Agmatine N4-coumaroyltransferase
 Flavonol-3-O-triglucoside O-coumaroyltransferase
 Naringenin-chalcone synthase
 Shikimate O-hydroxycinnamoyltransferase
 Trihydroxystilbene synthase

References 

Thioesters of coenzyme A
Hydroxycinnamic acid esters
Vinylogous carboxylic acids